Bugged! is a 1997 horror-comedy film written and directed by Roland K. Armstrong and distributed by Troma Entertainment.

Featuring an all-black cast, Bugged! tells the story of a group of bumbling exterminators who are called over to the house of an attractive young novelist to rid her house of insects. Unfortunately, due to a horrible chemical mix-up, the poison spray causes the bugs to grow to enormous sizes, and pretty soon everyone is trapped inside the house and have to find a way to stop the dastardly pests before they start multiplying and take over the world.

Tagline
They're urban, they're vermin, and THEY exterminate YOU!

External links

1997 films
American independent films
Troma Entertainment films
American comedy horror films
1990s comedy horror films
1997 comedy films
1990s English-language films
1990s American films